Ghost of Banana Tree is a 2005 film. It is a Cambodian horror film based on a Cambodian ghost story about a vengeful ghost haunting a banana tree and killing her husband.  It's the fourth horror film by Campro production, following Neang Neath, The Forest and The Haunted House.

Tagline
Ha! Handsome Man hides in Byemane Tree thinking I can't find you

Plot synopsis
The story is based on a Khmer tale. A man goes abroad for business. While he is away, his wife falls ill and dies. Her vengeful spirit begins to haunt the people of the village. The husband returns and believes his wife's ghost is actually his living wife until her ghost's arm grows unnaturally long. He flees the house for help, but, even after a proper Khmer burial, his wife's ghost follows him to a Buddhist monk's house, where he has sought safety. As he recites prayers, his wife's ghost climbs one of the many nearby banana trees to enter the house through a window. (It is traditionally considered inauspicious by the Khmer to grow banana trees close to a house, especially near a window.) She kills her husband, and the film ends with the couple's spirits flying to begin their next life together.

Origins 
The film is based on a Cambodian legend  at which has been marketed by Campro film production  as a true event occurred  at least during the 16th century. A folk belief, which many Khmer still follow, stems from this legend, forbidding people from planting banana trees next to their houses as a ghost spirit could enter the house by climbing in on a banana leaf. If there was already a banana tree growing close by, all of the banana tree's leaves touching or near the house would be cut off for safety. This centuries-old tradition is most common in more remote areas today.

See also
Nang Tani
List of ghost films

References

External links 
Official Website

2004 horror films
2004 films
Cambodian horror films
Folk horror films
Films directed by Heng Tola
Films about trees
Cambodian legends